Kate Jenkinson is an Australian actress, known for her various roles on The Wedge, as well as her role of Kendall Quinn on Super Fun Night. 
She is known for her role as Allie Novak in the Australian TV series Wentworth.

Education
Jenkinson graduated from Western Australian Academy of Performing Arts in 2004, winning the Nigel Rideout Award and has since been working constantly in drama and comedy on both stage and screen.

Career
In 2005, Jenkinson was nominated for the Best Newcomer Award for her role as Julia in the Black Swan State Theatre Company production of Zastrozzi and was a regular on the TV comedy series The Wedge from 2005 to 2007. She appeared as herself on Thank God You're Here in 2006–07, as well as Forgotten Cities, a new pilot for Working Dog Productions.

In 2007, she was in an episode of Shaun Micallef's Newstopia and had a lead guest role on the Channel 9 drama series, Canal Road. She began 2008 in the MTC production of Don Juan in Soho before commencing as a regular on SBS's Bogan Pride and guest roles on Rush, Satisfaction, Tangle, and Whatever Happened to That Guy. In 2013, she joined the cast of fellow Australian Rebel Wilson's TV series Super Fun Night. In 2015, she played Carol, the daughter of the title character in Shaun Micallef's sitcom The Ex-PM.

In 2015, Jenkinson joined the cast of Wentworth as prison inmate Allie Novak she has since been on the show and is confirmed to be in the final season of Wentworth Season 8 part 2. In Season 8 part 1 we see her as a "top dog" of the prison.

On 30 April 2019, it was announced that Jenkinson had joined the cast of Australian Medical drama, Doctor Doctor (known as The Heart Guy internationally). She played the role of Tara Khourdair during the fourth season, which commenced filming in April 2019, and aired from February to May 2020.

Personal life
Jenkinson lives with her partner Nathan and their two rescue dogs, Bowie and Bruno. In 2021 they had their first child, a son.

She was previously in a same-sex relationship.

Filmography

Awards

References

External links

Place of birth missing (living people)
Actresses from Perth, Western Australia
Living people
Rock Eisteddfod Challenge participants
Australian stage actresses
Australian television actresses
21st-century Australian actresses
Western Australian Academy of Performing Arts alumni
Year of birth missing (living people)
Bisexual actresses
Australian LGBT actors